Erethistidae are a family of catfishes that originate from southern Asia. It includes about 45 species.

Taxonomy
This family includes species previously placed in Sisoridae. They were removed because they were thought to be more closely related to the neotropical Aspredinidae than to the remaining sisorids due to a number of morphological characters. However, it has been suggested that the erethistid catfishes be included back into Sisoridae and some genera are included in that family by some authorities.

Distribution
Erethistids are found on the Indian subcontinent eastwards to western Thailand and northern Malay Peninsula.

Description
Many of the members of this family are small, cryptically colored fishes with tuberculate skin. Erethistids are distinguished from sisorids by having a pectoral girdle with a long coracoid process that extends well beyond the base of the pectoral fin; this structure can be felt through the skin in all genera and is visible externally in all genera except Pseudolaguvia. Erethistids differ from amblicipitids in that they lack a cuplike fold of skin in front of the pectoral fin (vs. possessing the cuplike fold), and have a dorsal fin with a strong spine and no thick covering of skin (vs. a weak spine with a thick covering of skin). Erethistids have nostrils close together, separated by a nasal barbel, which differs from akysids which have widely separated nostrils on each side of the head, with a barbel on the posterior nostril. Some erethistids possess a thoracic adhesive apparatus formed by longitudinal skin folds densely covered with unculi that appears to be an adaptation to life in fast flowing waters; this closely resembles a similar structure in the sisorid Glyptothorax.

References

 
Catfish families
Fish of South Asia
Taxa named by Pieter Bleeker